This is a list of Tamil national-type primary schools (SJK(T)) in Malacca, Malaysia. As of June 2022, there are 21 Tamil primary schools with a total of 2,310 students.

List of Tamil national-type primary schools in Malacca

Alor Gajah District 

As of June 2022, there are 10 Tamil primary schools with 930 students in Alor Gajah District.

Jasin District 
As of June 2022, there are 8 Tamil primary schools with 771 students in Jasin District.

Central Melaka District 
As of June 2022, there are 3 Tamil primary schools with 618 students in Central Melaka District.

See also 
 Tamil primary schools in Malaysia
 Lists of Tamil national-type primary schools in Malaysia

References

Schools in Malacca
Malacca
 Tamil-language schools in Malaysia